Psettina is a genus of small lefteye flounders native to the Indo-Pacific.

Species
There are currently 10 recognized species in this genus:
 Psettina brevirictis (Alcock, 1890)
 Psettina filimana S. Z. Li & H. M. Wang, 1982
 Psettina gigantea Amaoka, 1963 (Rough-scaled flounder)
 Psettina hainanensis (H. W. Wu & S. F. Tang, 1935)
 Psettina iijimae (D. S. Jordan & Starks, 1904)
 Psettina multisquamea Fedorov & Foroshchuk, 1988
 Psettina profunda (M. C. W. Weber, 1913)
 Psettina senta Amaoka & Larson, 1999
 Psettina tosana Amaoka, 1963
 Psettina variegata (Fowler, 1934)

References

Bothidae
Marine fish genera
Taxa named by Carl Leavitt Hubbs